Bad Sülze (until 1927 Sülze) is a town in the Vorpommern-Rügen district, in Mecklenburg-Western Pomerania, Germany. It is situated on the river Recknitz, 35 km southwest of Stralsund, and 35 km east of Rostock.

Nearby geographical features include a group of three lakes called Torfkuhlen Bad Sülze.

Excavations on the Redderstorfer corridor have shown that a settlement in the area of the present town existed from the Neolithic to Bronze Age and, later, from the Slavic times to the Middle Ages. Bad Sülze is known for its spas and may be the oldest brine and moorbath in northern Germany.

References

Cities and towns in Mecklenburg
Populated places established in the 13th century
1250s establishments in the Holy Roman Empire
1257 establishments in Europe
Grand Duchy of Mecklenburg-Schwerin
Spa towns in Germany